In mathematics, Nevanlinna's criterion in complex analysis, proved in 1920 by the Finnish mathematician Rolf Nevanlinna, characterizes holomorphic univalent functions on the unit disk which are starlike. Nevanlinna used this criterion to prove the Bieberbach conjecture for starlike univalent functions.

Statement of criterion
A univalent function h on the unit disk satisfying h(0) = 0 and h(0) = 1 is starlike, i.e. has image invariant under multiplication by real numbers in [0,1], if and only if  has positive real part for |z| < 1 and takes the value 1 at 0.

Note that, by applying the result to a•h(rz), the criterion applies on any disc |z| < r with only the requirement that f(0) = 0 and f'''(0) ≠ 0.

Proof of criterion
Let h(z) be a starlike univalent function on |z| < 1 with h(0) = 0 and h(0) = 1.

For  t < 0, define

a semigroup of holomorphic mappinga of D into itself fixing 0.

Moreover h is the Koenigs function for the semigroup ft.

By the Schwarz lemma, |ft(z)| decreases as t increases.

Hence

But, setting w = ft(z),

where

Hence

and so, dividing by |w|2,

Taking reciprocals and letting t go to 0 gives

for all |z| < 1.  Since the left hand side is a harmonic function, the maximum principle implies the inequality is strict.

Conversely if

has positive real part and g(0) = 1, then h can vanish only at 0, where it must have a simple zero.

Now

Thus as z traces the circle , the argument of the image  increases strictly. By the argument principle, since  has a simple zero at 0,
it circles the origin just once. The interior of the region bounded by the curve it traces is therefore starlike. If a is a point in the interior then the number of solutions N(a) of h(z) = a with |z| < r is given by

Since this is an integer, depends continuously on a and N(0) = 1, it is identically 1. So h is univalent and starlike in each disk |z| < r and hence everywhere.

Application to Bieberbach conjecture

Carathéodory's lemma
Constantin Carathéodory proved in 1907 that if

is a holomorphic function on the unit disk  D with  positive real part, then

 
In fact it suffices to show the result with g 
replaced by gr(z) = g(rz) for any r < 1 and then pass to the limit r = 1. 
In that case g extends to a continuous function on the closed disc with positive real part and by Schwarz formula

Using the identity

it follows that

,

so defines a probability measure, and

Hence

Proof for starlike functions
Let

be a univalent starlike function in |z| < 1.  proved that

In fact by Nevanlinna's criterion

has positive real part for |z|<1. So by Carathéodory's lemma

On the other hand

gives the recurrence relation

where a''1 = 1. Thus

so it follows by induction that

Notes

References

Analytic functions